The 2019 Cup of Nations was the first edition of the Cup of Nations, an international women's football tournament, held in Australia from 28 February to 6 March 2019. It consisted of a single match round-robin tournament and featured four teams.

Australia won the inaugural tournament.

Teams

Squads

Venues
Three cities were used as venues for the tournament.

Jubilee Oval was the originally announced venue for the Sydney matches, but it was changed to Leichhardt Oval due to poor pitch conditions.

Standings

All times are local (AEDT in Sydney and Melbourne, AEST in Brisbane).

Fixtures

Goalscorers

Broadcasters

Australia & New Zealand

Rest of the world

References

2019 Cup of Nations
2018–19 in Australian women's soccer
2019 in women's association football
February 2019 sports events in Australia
March 2019 sports events in Australia
Soccer in New South Wales
Soccer in Queensland
Soccer in Victoria (Australia)
Cup of Nations (Australia)